David Landau is a screenwriter and filmmaker. His screenplay Seance won Niad Management's Be A Hollywood Screenwriter competition, and his pitch for a television program based on his company, "Murder to Go," won the 2003 People's Pilot contest.  He won the Blackburn Award for Excellence in Playwriting for his comedy Deep Six Holiday.

With the publication of his The Mystery Express (1982), Landau is most often credited as the "inventor" of the interactive murder mystery. The play Murder at Café Noir is his most popular, having been performed over one hundred times across the United States.

In 1991, Murder at Café Noir was awarded the Orange Coast Magazine award for Best Dinner Theater.  Both Murder at Café Noir and its sequel Noir Suspicions are published by Samuel French.

Landau received his bachelor's degree at Ithaca College and his MFA in Screenwriting from Goddard College. He currently teaches screenwriting at Fairleigh Dickinson University.

Murder mystery plays
 Bullets for Broadway
 Contempt of Court
 Deadly Briefcase
 Killing Mr. Withers
 Mumm's the word
 Murder at Café Noir
 Murderous Crossings
 Murder Point Blank
 Murder: The Next Generation
 Noir Suspicions
 Spirits of Suscicion
 Virginia Jones and the Curse of Nergal
 Virginia Jones and the Inca Revenge
 The Altos: Like the Sopranos, only lower

References

  3. Murder To Go: Interactive Murder Mystery

External links
 David Landau's web site

American male screenwriters
Living people
Year of birth missing (living people)